Fernando Matías  Zampedri (born 14 February 1988) is an Argentine footballer who plays for Universidad Católica .

Career statistics

Club

Honours

Club
Rosario Central
Copa Argentina: 2017–18

Universidad Católica
Primera División de Chile: 2020, 2021
Supercopa de Chile: 2020, 2021

 Individual 
 Top goalscorer Primera División de Chile: 2020, 2021, 2022
 Top goalscorer Copa Chile: 2022

References

1988 births
Living people
Argentine footballers
Argentine people of Italian descent
Atlético de Rafaela footballers
Sportivo Belgrano footballers
Crucero del Norte footballers
Guillermo Brown footballers
Boca Unidos footballers
Juventud Unida de Gualeguaychú players
Atlético Tucumán footballers
Rosario Central footballers
Club Deportivo Universidad Católica footballers
Chilean Primera División players
Argentine Primera División players
Primera Nacional players
Expatriate footballers in Chile
Association football forwards
Sportspeople from Entre Ríos Province